National Route 163 is a national highway of Japan connecting Kita-ku, Osaka and Tsu, Mie in Japan, with a total length of 124.6 km (77.42 mi).

History
Route 163 was designated on 18 May 1953 from Osaka to Yokkaichi. On 1 April 1963 the section from Iga to Yokkaichi was redesignated as a portion of Route 25.

References

National highways in Japan
Roads in Kyoto Prefecture
Roads in Mie Prefecture
Roads in Nara Prefecture
Roads in Osaka Prefecture